Air Council (or Air Force Council) was the governing body of the Royal Air Force until the merger of the Air Ministry with the other armed forces ministries to form the Ministry of Defence in 1964. It was succeeded by the Air Force Board.

Members of the council

The Air Council was made up of several posts, the names of which changed over time. These included:
President of the Air Council, (1917–1919)
President – Secretary of State for Air, (1919–1964)
Vice-President of the Air Council – originally held by Lt-Gen Sir David Henderson, who resigned from post it ceased after that date (1917–1918)
Under-Secretary of State for Air, (1919–1964)
Chief of the Air Staff, (1918–1964)
Deputy Chief of the Air Staff (1930–1964) 
Vice Chief of the Air Staff, (1940–1964)
Air Member for Research and Development, renamed Air Member for Development and Production
Air Member for Supply and Research.(1923–1930)
Air Member for Supply and Organisation.(1930–1964)
Air Member for Training
Air Member for Technical Services, (1947–1951)
Controller of Research and Development  – from the Ministry of Air Production (MAP)
Director-General of Aircraft Production and Research
Director-General of Supply and Research
Inspector General of the RAF, (1918–1919)
Master-General of Personnel

See also
Army Council
Navy Board

References

External links
Air Council Appointments 1
Air Council Appointments 2

History of the Royal Air Force